Richmond Lass won 31 races as a harness racer and went on to win the 1969 Inter Dominion Pacing Championship. The horse was owned by Fred Miller, from Richmond House, Bung Bong, Victoria and driven by "respected local horseman Jack Moore."

Richmond L'Ami

Richmond L'Ami (with L'Ami being French for 'friend') a bay horse was born on 14 November 1975.  The dam was Richmond Lass and the sire, Tarport Boy.  Richmond L'Ami - a pacer - won a number of races including the Boort Cup on 30 January 1982.

Death

Richmond Lass died at Richmond Park, in a major bush-fire, at Bung Bong, on 14 January 1985.   There a memorial plaque erected at Richmond House.

Hall of Fame
In August 2017, Richmond Lass was inducted into the Victorian Harness Racing's, Hall of Fame as "one of Australia’s finest pacing mares".

Memorial race
The Harness Breeders VIC Richmond Lass race, has been "named in honour of one of the best mares produced in the southern hemisphere" with $30,000 prize money, and is held annually at the Tabcorp Park-Melton race track.

Further information on Richmond Lass is available from Australian Harness Racing.

See also
 Bung Bong, Victoria
 Harness racing in Australia
 Harness racing in New Zealand
 Inter Dominion Hall of Fame
 Rathscar, Victoria

Reference list

External links
  Avoca and District Historical Society

Inter Dominion winners
Standardbred racehorses bred in Australia
Racehorses trained in Australia
1963 racehorse births
1963 births
1985 deaths
Deaths from fire